"Let Her In" is a song written and recorded by English singer-songwriter Gary Benson, and released as a single in 1973. It was covered by John Travolta in 1976, and was released as the first single from Travolta's self-titled second album. Travolta's version was a hit, spending five months on the U.S. Billboard Hot 100, and peaking at number 10. It also reached number 16 on the Adult Contemporary chart. On the Cash Box chart, the song peaked at number five. In Canada, "Let Her In" reached number seven on the RPM Top Singles chart.

"Let Her In" was released at the end of the first year of the four-year run of Welcome Back, Kotter, in which Travolta starred.

This song was his first and only top-ten hit as a solo artist in the United States, and the biggest hit of his in any country not to be tied to the film Grease.  It was included on his 1978 double album compilation, Travolta Fever.

Chart performance

Weekly charts

Year-end charts

Reception
Tom Breihan criticized Travolta's performance of "a moony and generic song" in his December 2019 Stereogum article and later called it "truly wretched" in his January 2020 A.V. Club article. Paul Grein of Billboard in August 2022 called the ballad "mopey".

References

External links
 Song Lyrics
 

1973 songs
1973 singles
1976 singles
Gary Benson (musician) songs
John Travolta songs
Songs written by Gary Benson (musician)
1970s ballads